Psi is a Brazilian television series created by Contardo Calligaris and produced by HBO Brasil. Its first episode aired on 23 March 2014. A third season was confirmed in 2016, expected to debut in 2017.

Plot 
Carlo Antonini (Emílio de Mello), a psychoanalyst, psychologist and psychiatrist, works in São Paulo. While working at his clinic and relating to his ex-wife, his son, and two stepchildren, he lends himself to investigate on his own, in the vacant hours, crimes and complex cases of the city.

In the third season of the series, Denise played an accumulating patient who must deal with her mother's imminent death. With the help of Carlo, she discovers a family secret kept long ago. The two episodes starring Denise were directed by Luciano Moura.

Cast 
Emílio de Mello ... Carlo Antonini 
Claudia Ohana ... Valentina	
Raul Barretto ... Severino ou Caronte	
Aída Leiner ... Flávia	
Igor Armucho...Henrique	
Victor Mendes ... Mark	
Paula Picarelli...Taís	
Camila Leccioli...Janaína

Awards

References

External links

2014 Brazilian television series debuts
2010s Brazilian television series
Brazilian drama television series
Brazilian workplace television series
Television shows filmed in São Paulo (state)
Television shows set in São Paulo
Portuguese-language television shows
Portuguese-language HBO original programming
HBO Latin America original programming
HBO original programming